Before The Calm is the debut album from the Wigan-based band, Witness.  The album was released in the UK in 1999 via Island Records and spawned three singles for the band in "Scars", "Audition" and "Hijacker", with the former two placing in the Top 75 of the UK singles chart.

Reception
Upon release, the album was lauded with all-round critical acclaim. The Times noted that the album was "tethered to neither trend nor time" and that Witness themselves were "a band to cherish".  Melody Maker praised "the baroque fragility of Gerard Starkie’s vocals and the effortless, atmospheric swell of Ray Chan’s guitars".  NME declared Before The Calm "an astonishing debut album; stripped of all affectation", and went on to draw comparisons with Joy Division, DJ Shadow and Radiohead.  Other reviewers likened the sound of the LP to Wilco, The Blue Nile, the early releases of R.E.M., along with fellow Wigan band, The Verve.  Tim Perry of The Independent thought that Before The Calm encompassed "a satisfyingly undulating 45 minutes of delicate, late-night, soulful songs".  Allmusic noted that the album was conducive to repeated listens; "(t)he more one listens to this CD, the more one realizes just how moving and thoughtful songs like "Heirloom," "Scars," and "My Friend Will See Me Through" are".  Writing for Hi-Fi News and Record in September 1999, Johnny Black was impressed with the album's immediate accessibility, labelling Before The Calm a "truly wonderful debut" and Witness a band whose music was "moody, rootsy, gutsy, rockin'-folk with attitude".  Reviewing the album five months after its American release, Terry Eagan of Ink 19 described Before The Calm as a "dark album" in which "the listener is treated to some of the most beautiful lyrics and singing to appear this year".  In drawing comparisons to Velvet Underground and Unknown Pleasures, he also noted that the songs on the album serve to "create an intimacy between the performers and the listener that only the most classic of albums are capable of accomplishing".  In a retrospective look at the album in September 2006, Nick Southall of Stylus Magazine noted the depth of Gerard Starkie's lyrics and the "aged sadness" of his vocal delivery, declaring the album "the starkest, coldest, warmest, most haunted, most beautiful collection of songs to ever venture from the North West of England, despite what popular opinion may suggest".

Despite being well received by the music press, album sales were minimal, as the band's co-manager, the late Rob Partridge, contemporaneously noted that "Before The Calm doesn't include a really 'radio-friendly' single, so the promotional opportunities are quite limited".

Alternative version
The US version of the album was issued on MCA Records under the name "Witness UK" and, along with a different album cover and artwork, featured two additional bonus tracks—"Long First Chapter" and "Before The Calm"—which were to be found as b-sides on the UK single releases of "Scars" and "Hijacker", respectively.

Track listing
All tracks written by Witness, except where noted.

Personnel

Witness
Gerard Starkie – vocals, guitars
Ray Chan – guitars
Dylan Keeton – bass
John Langley – drums

Additional musicians
Julian Pransky-Poole – additional instrumentation

Recording credits
Phil Vinall – producer
Paul Read – engineer
Phelan Kane – programming

Release history

References

1999 debut albums
Island Records albums
MCA Records albums
Albums produced by Phil Vinall
Albums recorded at Rockfield Studios